Long Goodbye: A Tribute to Don Pullen is an album by David Murray, released on the Japanese DIW label. Recorded in 1996 and released in 1998, the album contains performances by Murray, pianist D.D. Jackson, bassist Santi Debriano, and drummer J. T. Lewis, in tribute to Don Pullen. The liner notes were penned by Jackson.

Critical reception
The Village Voice wrote that "despite some rousing passages, this is becalming and elegiac, a fitting companion to Pullen’s own Ode to Life."

Track listing
All compositions by Don Pullen except where noted.

 "Gratitude" – 7:52  
 "Resting on the Road" – 10:29  
 "Out of a Storm" (Jackson) – 8:38  
 "El Matador" – 4:32  
 "Easy Alice" (Jackson) – 8:10  
 "Long Goodbye" (Morris) – 8:00  
 "Common Ground" – 7:54

Personnel
 David Murray – tenor saxophone, bass clarinet
 D. D. Jackson – piano
 Santi Debriano – bass
 J. T. Lewis – drums

References 

1998 albums
David Murray (saxophonist) albums
DIW Records albums
Tribute albums